Białystok Voivodeship was a unit of administrative division and local government in Poland from 1945 to 1975, when its purview was separated into eastern Suwałki Voivodeship, Łomża Voivodeship and Białystok Voivodeship (1975–1998). Its capital city was Białystok. The establishment of Podlaskie Voivodeship in 1999 was essentially a reunion of the areas of Białystok Voivodeship (1945–1975).

The area's administrative region of 1950 amounted to 23 201 square kilometers, which was later reduced to 23 153 square kilometers. In 1946 the population approximately 941 000 and in 1970 it had approximately 1 176 000 inhabitants.

Politics
From 1945 to 1950 served as Voivodes Jerzy Sztachelski, Stefan Dybowski, Stanisław Krupka and Julian Horodecki.

Formation of the Voivodeship party structure
Creation of its structures began only after July 27, 1944, when the Soviet Armed Forces entered Bialystok. In August this year the PPR Provincial Committee was created. It should be added that none of the members of this committee she was not formally a member of this party. First members in the Bialystok Voivodeship
they were not admitted to the Polish Workers' Party until August 21, 1944, during a meeting of the Provincial Committee. Following the unification of the PPS and PPR, The Polish United Workers' Party in the Białystok Voivodeship included about 16 thousand former PPR members and 3.5 thousand members of the former PPS. Secretaries 73% newly
created basic party organizations were members of the former Polish Workers' Party, while members of the aforementioned party organizations were appointed deputy secretaries
PPS.

On December 23, 1948, during the meeting of the provincial committees of the former PPR and PPS, the Provincial Committee and the executive committee of the Polish United Workers' Party in Bialystok were elected. Mieczysław Tureniec from the PPR was elected the first secretary of the Polish United Workers' Party
and Stefan Dąbek from the former PPS as Second Secretary.

In 1944 to 1956, the function of the first secretary of the Polish United Workers' Party Voivodeship Committee in Bialystok was held by the following
people: Edwarda Orłowska (1944-1945), Mieczysław Bodalski (1945-1947), Mieczysław Tureniec, Józef Faruga, Józef Rygliszyn, Grzegorz Wojciechowski, Stanisław Brodziński and Jan Jabłoński. On the wave of October 1956 transformations, for a period of less than three weeks
Antoni Laskowski was the secretary. Arkadiusz Łaszewicz took this position in November 1956 following the political overhaul which followed the Polish October.

Voivodeship National Council
At the state apparatus level, Bialystok Voivodeship National Council (the Voivodeship regional parliament) was created The first, inaugural meeting of the Voivodeship National Council in 57a Warszawska street in Bialystok was held on August 28, 1944, with 23 members. dr Jerzy Sztachelski, was elected as the chairman, the vice-chairmen in the persons of Jakub Antoniuk and Władysław Nieśmiałek and the secretary general - Tadeusz Jackowski. The creation of WRN from Bialystok took place on the basis of the Provisional Statute of the National Councils. Due to Sztachelski's appointment as Voivode, at the meeting of the Voivodeship National Council on October 21, 1944, Jan Kuśniarek was appointed to replace him as the head of that body with Jakub Antoniuk as deputy and Bolesław Sokół and Eugenia Krassowska as members of the presidium. In February 1945 Tadeusz Jackowski became the head with Bolesław Podedworny as his deputy and Edward Orłowska, Bolesław Sokół and Eugenia Krassowska as members of the presidium.  It was later led by Julian Horodecki (14.04.1950–13.04.1952), Mieczysław Moczar (22.04.1952–15.12.1954), Józef Szczęśniak (15.04.1954–01.12.1956), Stanisław Juchnicki (01.12.1956–07.02.1958), Jerzy Popko (07.12.1958–21.11.1962), Stefan Żmijko (21.11.1962–04.03.1972 and Zygmunt Sprycha (04.03.1972–12.12.1973)

History 

In early 1944, when the Red Army crossed the Polish frontier before the war, the Bialystok Voivodeship was divided administratively by the German-occupied areas incorporated into the Third Reich (Bezirk Bialystok) and the occupied territories of the USSR (Reich Commissariat East).

Over the next months, the front moved into the pre-war Polish territory. However, according to the findings of the Tehran Conference of 1943, it was known that the pre-war Polish eastern territories would be incorporated into the Soviet Union and eastern territories of Germany would be incorporated into Polish (more precisely define these territorial changes occurred during the Yalta Conference and the Potsdam Conference ). For this reason, the Polish territories occupied by the Red Army in early 1944 did not create the Polish administration. Only after crossing the line in July 1944 the Bug, which would be the future eastern border of Poland, Polish authorities were established in the form of the Polish Committee of National Liberation (PCNL).

A month after the start of its operations, PCNL issued the Decree of the Polish Committee of National Liberation of August 21, 1944 on the Procedure for the appointment of general administration authorities and second instance, which came into force on 22 August 1944. In this decree (Article 11), it abolished the administrative structure introduced by Germany and restored the Bialystok Voivodeship administrative divisions from the Second Polish Republic. At the time, the front line ran in front of the Vistula and Narew, and the formal authority PKWN had was only in part of the pre-war Bialystok Voivodeship.

29 September 1944, administration of 17 (of the 23) districts of Belastok Region (including the city of Białystok) and an additional three (Siemiatycze, Hajnówka and Kleszczele) of the Brest Region was passed to the Polish Committee of National Liberation from the Byelorussian SSR.

31 December 1944 the Provisional Government of the Republic of Poland replaced the Polish Committee of National Liberation.

14 March 1945 the Provisional Government of the Republic of Poland made the initial administrative division of the German lands included in the Polish (so-called Recovered Territories ), even before taking all of these areas, creating them four administrative districts do not have the status of regions: Region I (Opole Silesia), District II (Lower Silesia), District III (West Pomerania), District IV (Mazury).

The Border Agreement between Poland and the USSR of 16 August 1945 established the borders between the Union of Soviet Socialist Republics (USSR) and the Republic of Poland. It was signed by the Provisional Government of National Unity.

August 18, 1945 transferred Lomza County from the Warsaw Voivodeship to the Białystok Voivodeship.

September 25, 1945 part of the counties of the Recovered Territories transmitted under the management of the Białystok Voivodeship (Gołdap, Ełk and Olecko) from District IV (Mazury). These districts have provisionally become parts of the Voivodeship, although de jure continue to form part of Recovered Territories (MP, 1945 No. 29, item. 77). On June 28, 1946, the areas of the Recovered Territories assigned to Białystok Voivodeship were formally transferred.

Some cities lost civic rights without joining larger neighboring cities: Dąbrowa Białostocka*, Kleszczele*, Krynki, Sokoły, Suchowola*, Tykocin* (1950)

1 July 1952 created Siemiatycze County.

1954 the following Counties were created:  hajnowski, łapy, moniecki, zambrow 

Between 1954 and 1972, gromadas formed the lowest tier of local government in the voivodeship, taking over the role previously played by gminy. A gromada would generally consist of several villages, but they were smaller units than the gminy had been. In 1973 gminy were reintroduced and gromadas abolished.

1956 the following counties were created:  dąbrowski (białostocki), sejneński

Administrative divisions

Województwo białostockie (1946)

Województwo białostockie 

List of Counties in 1967:
City Counties: Białystok. (1)
Land Counties: Augustów, Białystok, Bielsk Podlaski, Dąbrowa Białostocka, Ełk, Gołdap, Grajewo, Hajnówka, Kolno, Łapy, Łomża, Mońki, Olecko, Sejny, Siemiatycze, Sokółka, Suwałki, Wysokie Mazowieckie, Zambrów. (19)

Adjacent voivodeships
The Voivodeship shares a border on the east with the Olsztyn Voivodeship, the southwest with the Warsaw Voivodeship, the south with the Lublin Voivodeship, the north with  the RSFSR's Kaliningrad Oblast, the northeast with the Lithuanian SSR and the east with the Byelorussian SSR.

See also
 Białystok Voivodeship (1919–1939)
 Białystok Voivodeship (1975–1998)

References

Further reading
 Brzostek, Agnieszka. Przyczynek do działalności Wojewódzkiej Rady Narodowej w Białymstoku w latach 1944–1950. Studia Podlaskie T. 15, 2005, pp. 187–202

Former voivodeships of Poland (1945–1975)